Rhodacmea is a genus of small freshwater snails or limpets, aquatic gastropod mollusks in the family Planorbidae, the ram's horn snails and their allies.

Rhodacmea is the type genus of the subfamily Rhodacmeinae.

Anatomy 
These animals have a pallial lung, as do all pulmonate snails, but they also have a false gill or "pseudobranch".  This serves as a gill, which is necessary as, in their non-tidal habitat, these limpets never reach the surface for air.

Species
Species in the genus Rhodacmea include:
 Rhodacmea elatior (Anthony, 1855) – Domed ancylid
 Rhodacmea filosa (Conrad, 1834) – Wicker ancylid, type species
 Rhodacmea hinkleyi (Walker, 1908)

References

Planorbidae
Taxonomy articles created by Polbot